The Hypolycaenini are a small tribe of butterflies in the family Lycaenidae. It is alternatively treated as a subtribe, Hypolycaenina, of the Theclini.

Genera
As not all Theclinae have been assigned to tribes, the following list of genera is preliminary:

 Hemiolaus
 Hypolycaena
 Chliaria
 Zeltus
 Leptomyrina

References

 
Theclinae
Butterfly tribes